Barakhain Jameya Jamhuria Fazil Madrasah is an Islamic institution situated at Barakhain in Anwara, Chittagong. It was established to train the students Islam-based education and culture  in 1974.

Location
This madrasah is located at Barakhain Union in Anwara, Chittagong, Bangladesh.

History
The madrasah mentioned above was established with the locals' co-operation in 1974. In 1975, it was accepted with Dakhil level (SSC) by Bangladesh Madrasah Education Board. Also, it was granted to teach the students up to Alim level (HSC) by same board in 1996. Again It was permitted to take classes up to Fadil level (degree) by Islamic Arabic University in 2017.

Accomplishment
The madrasah was entitled as the best institution from Upazila level by National Education Week-16 organised by Education Ministry.

Facilities
The are an open playground, a mosque, a large pond, an IT room, a library and a hostel for students in the madrasah.

Teachers
There are 21 teachers and 3 staffs in this institution.

Students
There are almost 950 students in the madrasah, as of (2020). The students from this madrasah go for higher education to the university passing the grade JDC, Dakhil, Alim and Fadil every year.

References

Madrasas in Bangladesh
Education in Chittagong
Alia madrasas of Bangladesh
Educational Institutions in Bangladesh